On 23 February 2021, Senegal began its national vaccination program against the COVID-19. As of 10 March, 68,205 people in Senegal have been able to be vaccinated.

History

Timeline

February 2021 
On 23 February 2021, Senegal began its national vaccination program against COVID-19 using the Sinopharm BIBP vaccine.

March 2021 
By the end of the month 309,128 vaccine doses had been administered, including 260,754 first doses.

April 2021 
By the end of the month 470,009 vaccine doses had been administered, including 406,981 first doses.

May 2021 
By the end of the month more than half a million vaccine doses had been administered, including 456,135 first doses.

June 2021 
By the end of the month 0.7 million vaccine doses had been administered, including 0.5 million first doses.

July 2021 
By the end of the month 1.1 million vaccine doses had been administered while 806,510 persons had been vaccinated.

August 2021 
By the end of the month 1.6 million vaccine doses had been administered while 1,167,364 persons had been vaccinated.

September 2021 
By the end of the month 1.8 million vaccine doses had been administered while 1,251,403 persons had been vaccinated.

October 2021 
By the end of the month 1.9 million vaccine doses had been administered, including 1.3 million first doses, and 13% of the targeted population had been fully vaccinated.

November 2021 
By the end of the month 1.9 million vaccine doses had been administered, including 1.3 million first doses, and 13% of the targeted population had been fully vaccinated.

December 2021 
By the end of the month two million vaccine doses had been administered, including 1.4 million first doses, and 14% of the targeted population had been fully vaccinated.

January 2022 
By the end of the month two million vaccine doses had been administered, including 1.4 million first doses, and 14% of the targeted population had been fully vaccinated.

February 2022 
By the end of the month 2.5 million vaccine doses had been administered, including 1.5 million first doses, while more than a million persons had been fully vaccinated.

March 2022 
By the end of the month 2.5 million vaccine doses had been administered, including 1.5 million first doses, while more than a million persons had been fully vaccinated.

April 2022 
By the end of the month 2.5 million vaccine doses had been administered, including 1.5 million first doses, while more than a million persons had been fully vaccinated.

Vaccine in order

Progress 
Cumulative vaccinations
The following figure presents the cumulative number of people in Senegal who have been vaccinated (vertical axis) since the starting date of vaccinations in Senegal (horizontal axis: date)

References 

Senegal
Vaccination
Senegal